Lake Solitude is  a lake located in Grand Teton National Park, in the U.S. state of Wyoming. The  in circumference natural lake is situated at the head of north Cascade Canyon and is a popular destination for hikers and backpackers.

See also
Geology of the Grand Teton area

References

Lakes of Grand Teton National Park